The chief public health officer of Canada (CPHO) is the lead health professional and primary spokesperson on public health related matters for the Government of Canada. The chief public health officer provides advice to the minister of health and the president of the Public Health Agency of Canada (PHAC), works in collaboration with the agency president in the agency's leadership and management, and works with other departments and levels of government on public health matters. PHAC, along with the CPHO post was established in 2004 amidst the SARS crisis.

The third and current chief public health officer of Canada is Theresa Tam, who was appointed in June 2017.

Overview 
The CPHO position was created by Carolyn Bennett in her position as Minister of State for Public Health (Canada) in 2004, along with the Public Health Agency of Canada. Per the Public Health Agency of Canada Act (2006), the CPHO holds office "during pleasure for a term not exceeding five years". The CPHO can be reappointed for additional terms.

The CPHO is selected through an open and transparent national competitive process, and is appointed by the Governor-in-Council. The process is merit-based: as per the Public Health Agency of Canada Act, the CPHO must be a qualified public health professional.

Responsibilities 
The CPHO is responsible for:

 Providing public health advice to the minister of health and to the president of the Public Health Agency of Canada, and, as appropriate, work with other federal departments and agencies, provincial/territorial governments, the international community, health practitioners and Canadians on public health issues;
 Giving the minister of health an annual report on Canadian public health;
 Providing leadership of the Public Health Agency of Canada;
 Taking a leadership/advocacy role in national public health matters and citizen engagement in public health;
 Taking accountability for health provisions related to official acts (eg. the Quarantine Act, the Department of Health Act, the Public Health Agency of Canada Act, and the Human Pathogens and Toxins Act); and
 Assuming the role of the federal government spokesperson on public health issues, in particular, during public health emergencies.

During public health emergencies, such as outbreaks or natural disasters, the CPHO is responsible for:
 Working with relevant professionals and officials to plan responses and to provide Canadians with information about plan outbreak responses and how to protect themselves;
 Providing briefings and advice to the president of the Public Health Agency, the minister of health, and others; and
 Communicating public health information to Canadians via different channels.

The chief public health officer was the head of the Public Health Agency of Canada until 2014, in which government of Prime Minister Stephen Harper reorganized the management structure of PHAC through a 2014 omnibus budget bill and instituted a parallel presidential-structure and position to govern the organization, that then could be staffed by non-medical and non-scientific personnel. The NDP health critic said at the time that: "To bury it in an omnibus bill says to me that they don't want people to know about it and they don't want questions," while Health Minister Rona Ambrose said that "the idea for the new structure came from the agency itself," which was led at the time on an interim basis for the previous 16 months by Gregory W. Taylor.

Areas of focus

2017–present 
Theresa Tam, who has held the position since June 26 2017, released a vision statement in early 2018. She wishes to pay particular attention to the reduction of health discrepancies in the country, which includes collaborating with and reducing the socioeconomic gap of Indigenous Peoples. Her six areas of focus are currently:
 The risks of antimicrobial resistance and the correct use of antibiotics;
 Building healthy environments that reduce health discrepancies;
 The championing of youth health;
 The reduction of blood-borne and sexually transmitted infections;
 The reduction of Tuberculosis in at-risk populations; and
 Promoting education on substances (especially alcohol, opioids and marijuana), particularly their effects on youth

As CPHO, Tam wrote Fifteen years post-SARS: Key milestones in Canada's public health emergency response, in which she remarked somewhat presciently as it turns out that:

Chief public health officers
Theresa Tam is the third and present CPHO. Initially taking on the role in an acting capacity on December 16, 2016 following the retirement of Gregory Taylor, Tam was formally appointed on June 26, 2017, and led the Government of Canada's COVID-19 response in 2020.

See also 
 Medical officer of health
 Chief Medical Officer (United Kingdom)
 Chief Medical Officer, Republic of Ireland
 Surgeon General of the United States

Notes

References

External links 
 Chief Public Health Officer of Canada
 Public Health Agency of Canada

Canadian health officials
Canada